Louie Richardson (born September 22, 1985) is a professional Canadian football defensive end for the BC Lions of the Canadian Football League. He played CIS football for the Manitoba Bisons.

Professional career

Hamilton Tiger-Cats
Richardson was signed as an undrafted free agent by the Hamilton Tiger-Cats on May 24, 2012 and spent two seasons with the team, appearing in nine regular season games.

Winnipeg Blue Bombers
Richardson signed with the Winnipeg Blue Bombers on April 7, 2014. He played a total of 21 games over two years for Winnipeg before being released as part of final training camp cuts in 2016.

Hamilton Tiger-Cats (II)
Richardson re-signed with the Tiger-Cats on September 13, 2016 and played in six regular season games and one playoff game for the club. He became a free agent at the end of the season.

BC Lions
Richardson signed with the BC Lions on July 11, 2017.

References

External links
BC Lions bio
Winnipeg Blue Bombers bio 

1985 births
Canadian football defensive linemen
Hamilton Tiger-Cats players
Living people
Manitoba Bisons football players
Players of Canadian football from British Columbia
Canadian football people from Vancouver
Winnipeg Blue Bombers players
BC Lions players